Leslie Encina (born 2 January 1982) is a Chilean long distance runner. He competed in the men's marathon at the 2017 World Championships in Athletics. In 2018, he competed in the men's half marathon at the 2018 IAAF World Half Marathon Championships held in Valencia, Spain. He finished in 98th place.

References

External links

1982 births
Living people
Chilean male long-distance runners
Chilean male marathon runners
World Athletics Championships athletes for Chile
Place of birth missing (living people)
Athletes (track and field) at the 2007 Pan American Games
Athletes (track and field) at the 2011 Pan American Games
Athletes (track and field) at the 2015 Pan American Games
Athletes (track and field) at the 2019 Pan American Games
Pan American Games competitors for Chile